Sodium citrate may refer to any of the sodium salts of citric acid (though most commonly the third):
 Monosodium citrate
 Disodium citrate
 Trisodium citrate
The three forms of salt are collectively known by the E number E331.

Applications

Food 
Sodium citrates are used as acidity regulators in food and drinks, and also as emulsifiers for oils. They enable cheeses to melt without becoming greasy. It reduces the acidity of food as well.

Blood clotting inhibitor 
Sodium citrate is used to prevent donated blood from clotting in storage. It is also used in a laboratory, before an operation, to determine whether a person's blood is too thick and might cause a blood clot, or if the blood is too thin to safely operate. Sodium citrate is used in medical contexts as an alkalinizing agent in place of sodium bicarbonate, to neutralize excess acid in the blood and urine.

Metabolic acidosis 
It has applications for the treatment of metabolic acidosis and chronic kidney disease.

Ferrous nanoparticles 
Along with oleic acid sodium citrate may be used in the synthesis of magnetic Fe3O4 nanoparticles coatings.

References

Citrates
Chelating agents
Organic sodium salts
E-number additives